Lindy Li (born 1990) is an American political commentator, campaign advisor, and former political candidate serving as the Women's Co-Chair and Mid-Atlantic Regional Chair at the Democratic National Committee. She served on the Asian American outreach team for the Joe Biden 2020 presidential campaign.

Early life and education
Li was born in Chengdu, Sichuan, China, moved to Sheffield, England at age three, and immigrated with her family to the United States when she was five years old. She spent much of her childhood in Malvern, Pennsylvania. Li attended the Agnes Irwin School, a private college-preparatory day school for girls, graduating in 2008. Her father is a real estate executive. Li has a younger brother named Jeffrey. In high school, Li interned for Pennsylvania Congressman and 2020 Presidential Candidate, Joe Sestak.

Li attended Princeton University and was elected class president at age 17. She became the first woman at Princeton to hold the position of class president for all four years. At Princeton, she started the Do It In the Dark campaign, which encouraged students around the country to reduce their carbon footprint. She wrote her senior thesis on the ethics of climate change legislation and graduated in 2012 with a philosophy degree.

Career
Before entering politics, Li worked as a financial analyst for Merck and Morgan Stanley.

In 2016, at age 24, Li became a candidate for Pennsylvania's 7th congressional district. She was the youngest female congressional candidate in U.S. history. Three months before the Democratic primary, she transferred her candidacy to the 6th congressional district, citing advice from party leaders. Li withdrew her candidacy in April 2016, after a court challenge that she did not have enough signatures from registered Democrats in her own district.

In 2018, Li was one of ten candidates competing in the Democratic primary for Pennsylvania's 5th congressional district. The 2018 Democratic primary was won by Mary Gay Scanlon.

Li serves as a political contributor for NBC News and MSNBC. Li also hosted a weekly TV series, Listening with Lindy Li, which aired on cable television in the Philadelphia area.  On her show she interviewed various figures including members of the Pennsylvania House of Representatives, the former CEO of Comcast, David L. Cohen, and others. Li was featured in a 2020 Fox News documentary titled My Socialism Nightmare.

Li previously served as the Treasurer for the Pennsylvania Young Democrats from 2017 to 2020. Li resigned the post after conflict with group leaders over her Twitter posts critical of Bernie Sanders and his supporters. Li alleged her resignation was a real-life example of bullying by Bernie Bros; the club president denied this, saying that her resignation was voluntary.

After the 2020 Super Tuesday primary elections, Li appeared on Al Jazeera to debate Sanders supporter Linda Sarsour concerning which Democrat would be best to defeat Donald Trump.
During the interview, Li stated that she would not vote for Bernie Sanders if he became the Democratic nominee.

Alongside Aftab Pureval, the Mayor of Cincinnati, Ohio, Li co-chairs the Justice Unites Us Super PAC, a multi-million dollar political action committee that focuses specifically on increasing Asian-American turnout across the country, particularly in battleground states. In 2022, she was named by City & State Pennsylvania as one of the rising stars of Philadelphia. In November 2022, she was also named by City & State Pennsylvania as one of the 100 most powerful women in the state and was one of the youngest to make the list.

References

1990 births
American women of Chinese descent in politics
American politicians of Chinese descent
Asian-American people in Pennsylvania politics
Joe Biden 2020 presidential campaign
Living people
Princeton University alumni
Politicians from Philadelphia
American political consultants
21st-century American women politicians
21st-century American politicians
Pennsylvania Democrats
Chinese emigrants to the United States
Politicians from Chengdu
Women financial analysts
American financial analysts
Agnes Irwin School alumni